Christian Görke (born 17 March 1962) is a German politician for Die Linke and was deputy Minister-president of the federal state of Brandenburg from 2014 to 2019.

Life and achievements
Görke was born 1962 in Rathenow and became a teacher in 1988.

In 1985 he joined the Socialist Unity Party of Germany and after German reunification became member of Die Linke, serving as the party's federal chairman in Brandenburg from 2014 to 2018.

He became a Member of the Bundestag in the 2021 federal election, contesting Cottbus – Spree-Neiße but coming in fifth place.

References

Living people
1962 births
People from Rathenow
Ministers of the Brandenburg State Government
Politicians from Brandenburg
Members of the Bundestag 2021–2025

Members of the Bundestag for Brandenburg
Members of the Bundestag for The Left
20th-century German educators